Colin H. Williams (born 1950 in Barry, South Wales, UK) is a senior research associate at the VHI, l St Edmund's College, the University of Cambridge, UK. He was formerly a research professor in sociolinguistics, and later a honorary professor, in the School of Welsh at Cardiff University.

Biography
Williams attended Ysgol Gymraeg y Barri and Ysgol Uwchradd Rhydfelen (renamed Ysgol Gyfun Rhydfelen and now Ysgol Gyfun Garth Olwg) before pursuing university studies at Swansea University. He graduated summa cum laude B.Sc. Econ in geography and politics in 1972. He then began his Ph.D. research on 'Language Decline and Nationalist Resurgence.' The Ph.D. was awarded by the University of Wales in 1978. In November 2017 he was awarded an honorary D.Litt. by the University of Wales.

In 1973 he gained an English Speaking Union Scholarship tenable at the Department of Geography, the University of Western Ontario, Canada and undertook field work on the challenges facing the French language in Quebec and Acadia. Returning to Wales he was appointed an Open University Tutor and a Demonstrator at the Department of Geography, University College of Swansea, 1974–1976, before taking up an appointment teaching in the Departments of Geography and Politics and International Relations at North Staffordshire Polytechnic, now Staffordshire University, where he was successively, lecturer, principal lecturer and professor of geography. In 1993, while he was working in Toronto as a Multicultural History Society of Ontario Fellow, he was appointed a research professor, School of Welsh, Cardiff University, the post he occupied until 2015. In June 2015 he was elected a visiting fellow, St Edmund's College, University of Cambridge, where he specialises in aspects of peace and conflict, human rights and minority relations and comparative policy development in multilingual and multicultural polities. https://www.vhi.st-edmunds.cam.ac.uk/directory/williams  In January 2018 he was named as a senior research associate of the Von Hügel Institute, St Edmund's  College, University of Cambridge, where he works on peace and reconciliation in post-conflict societies.

His main scholarly interests are sociolinguistics and language policy in multicultural societies, ethnic and minority relations and political geography. He is a former Fulbright Scholar in Residence and visiting professor, The Department of Geography, Pennsylvania State University, 1982–83, a SSRC/SHFR Exchange Scholar (1982) and Swedish Institute Scholar (1988) at the Centre for the Study of International Conflicts, Department of History, University of Lund, and an adjunct professor of geography, University of Western Ontario, 1994 to date. In 2002 he was a visiting fellow of Mansfield College and Jesus College, Oxford University and a visiting fellow of Mansfield College again in 2010. In 2009 he was  a visiting professor at the Department of Political Science, the University of Ottawa in connection with the SSHRC sponsored ARUC project.

In April 2000 the National Assembly for Wales appointed him to be a member of the Welsh Language Board, a post he held until 2011. In May 2013 he was elected a Fellow of the Learned Society of Wales. He was an honorary professor of Celtic Studies at the University of Aberdeen, until 2009  and remains an adjunct professor of geography at the University of Western Ontario, Canada.

He is the author/editor of numerous books, including:
Called Unto Liberty: On Language and Nationalism Multilingual Matters, Clevedon, Avon, 1994
The Political Geography of the New World Order, J. Wiley, London, 1993
A Welsh Language Board sponsored project on Community Language Planning and Policy, whose first major report was published as Williams, C.H. and Evas, J.C Y Cynllun Ymchwil Cymunedol (The Community Research Project), Welsh Language Board, Cardiff, August 1997, 3rd Edition 2000
Language Revitalization in Wales: Policy and Planning University of Wales Press, Cardiff, 2000
Language and Governance, University of Wales Press, 2007
Linguistic Minorities in Democratic Context, Palgrave, 2008
Minority Language Promotion, Protection and Regulation: The Mask of Piety, Palgrave, 2013
 Co-editor with S. Pertot and T. Priestley, Rights, Promotion and Integration Issues for Minority Rights in Europe, Palgrave, 2009
 Co-editor with H.S. Thomas, Parents, Personalities and Power, University of Wales Press, 2012.

He has been involved in research projects comparing the office of Language Commissioner in Canada and Europe; and a  study of Official Language Strategies in Canada and Europe. His current project focusses on the New Speaker challenge for Official Language Strategies. The New Speakers Network

Affiliations
He was a member of the scientific committee of Lingua Mon, Barcelona, 2007–2013 and of the Basque Academy's Social History of the Basque Language. In January 2008 he was appointed by the Government of Ireland as one of six specialists charged with preparing a 20-year strategy for the Irish language. Currently he is advising the Government of  Wales on its revised language strategy.

Sources
 Language Revitalization in Wales: Policy and Planning, University of Wales Press, Cardiff. 2000.
 Language and Governance, University of Wales Press, 2007.
 Linguistic Minorities in Democratic Context, Palgrave, 2008.
 Marquis Who's Who in the World, 2008.

External links
 Welsh Language Board Cambridge University; https://www.vhi.st-edmunds.cam.ac.uk/directory/williams

1950 births
Living people
Academics of Cardiff University
Welsh scholars and academics
Alumni of Swansea University
Academics of Staffordshire University
University of Western Ontario alumni
Academics of the Open University
People from Barry, Vale of Glamorgan